The Court at 275 North Chester Avenue is a bungalow court located at 275 North Chester Avenue in Pasadena, California. Owner Fern Parlee built the court in 1928. The court consists of six buildings; five two-unit homes are arranged around a central courtyard, while a single one-unit home is located in a rear corner. The court's layout features multiple tiers separated by steps, an uncommon design for a bungalow court. The houses have a vernacular Spanish-influenced design with stucco walls, clay tile roofs, and wrought iron light fixtures.

The court was added to the National Register of Historic Places on November 15, 1994.

References

Bungalow courts
Houses in Pasadena, California
Houses completed in 1928
Houses on the National Register of Historic Places in California
Historic districts on the National Register of Historic Places in California
National Register of Historic Places in Pasadena, California
1928 establishments in California
Spanish Colonial Revival architecture in California